Thounaojam Chaoba Singh (born 24 May 1937 in Utlou, Bishnupur district, Manipur) is former Indian Union minister and Bharatiya Janata Party state president from Manipur.

He began his career with the Indian National Congress. From 1972, to 1995, Chaoba won from the Nambol Assembly Seat 5 times. He was Deputy Speaker of Manipur Legislative Assembly from 1974 to 1975. He became deputy chief minister of Manipur from 1994 to 1995.

He was elected to the 11th Lok Sabha in 1996 from Inner Manipur from the Indian National Congress. He was elevated to the role of Congress Party state president in 1997.

He was re-elected from this seat to the 12th Lok Sabha in 1998 and 13th Lok Sabha in 1999, but both times contesting with his regional party, the Manipur State Congress Party.

In 1999, he became the Union Minister of State, Culture, Youth Affairs and Sports in the government of Prime Minister Atal Bihari Vajpayee.

Chaoba Singh joined the Bharatiya Janata Party prior to the 2004 Indian General Elections. He was named the Manipur BJP President and kept that role until 2006.

In the interim years, Singh formed his own Manipur People's Party.

In 2012, he was once again named Manipur BJP President and held that position until 2016.

Chaoba Singh was named by various source as one of the front-runners to be Chief Minister  during the 2017 Manipur Legislative Assembly election. However, he ended up losing from the Nambol and post went to N. Biren Singh.

References

External links 
 Lok Sabha Members Bioprofile

Living people
1937 births
Bharatiya Janata Party politicians from Manipur
People from Bishnupur district
Deputy Chief Ministers of Manipur
State cabinet ministers of Manipur
Lok Sabha members from Manipur
Union ministers of state of India
India MPs 1999–2004
Deputy Speakers of the Manipur Legislative Assembly
India MPs 1996–1997
India MPs 1998–1999
Manipur MLAs 1972–1974
Manipur MLAs 1974–1979
Manipur MLAs 1980–1984
Manipur MLAs 1985–1990
Manipur MLAs 1990–1995
Recipients of the Padma Shri in public affairs